Proddatur (1915) is a city in the YSR Kadapa District of Andhra Pradesh, located on the banks of the Penna River.  The city is a municipality, and also the mandal headquarters of Proddatur mandal.  It is the second-largest town in former Kadapa District.  It is the oldest municipality which formed before Independence.

Proddatur got its name from the history of Ramayana, where Lord Ram resided.  Many temples are located here.  The temple where Lord Rama resided is located on the banks of Penna River, known as Rameshwaram.  It is also known as Second Bombay (siripuram) for business and Second Mysore for its grandeur in Dussehra celebrations. It is the 13th largest urban agglomeration in Andhrapradesh.  It became a municipality in 1915 later it is upgraded from 3rd to 2nd,1st.  In 1998, it became a Special Grade Municipality.  In 2010, based on socio-economic conditions the Proddatur–to–Cumbum railway section was sanctioned in 2010 which plays as strategic importance for the town.  National Highway 67 passes through this town.  This town is centre for small towns like Jammalamadugu, Mydukur, Yerraguntla and Pulivendula.  Large number of people from these small towns commute to Proddatur for their livelihoods. A district government hospital (350 beds) is located in Proddatur.

It also has a forest division—Proddatur Forest Division.

Demographics
 census, Proddatur urban agglomeration has population of 217,895.The city had a population of 162,816. Proddatur is one of the most densely populated municipalities in Andhra Pradesh. There are 81,368 males and 81,448 females in the total population; a sex ratio of 1001 females per 1000 males, higher than the national average of 940 per 1000. 15,516 children are in the age group of 0–6 years, of which 7,999 are boys and 7,517 are girls; a ratio of 940 per 1000. The average literacy rate stands at 78.08% (male 86.02%; female 70.20%) with 115,011 literates, significantly higher than the national average of 73.00%.

Its urban agglomeration had a population of 217,895, of which males constitute 108,986, females represent 108,900; a sex ratio of 999 females per 1000 men; 21,616 are in the age group of 0–6 years. There are a total of 147,156 literates, with an average literacy rate of 75.97%.

Governance 
Kadapa and Proddatur are the only municipalities which were formed before independence in the district. Proddatur municipality was formed in 1915. It was upgraded as a Special Grade Municipality in 1998.

The city is one of the 31 cities in the state to be a part of water supply and sewerage services mission known as the Atal Mission for Rejuvenation and Urban Transformation, or AMRUT. As per the National Urban Sanitation Policy, the city was ranked 327th in the country in 2009–10, with a total of 27.450 points.

Economy 
Its economy is mainly driven by gold and cotton businesses, book manufacturing, and financing.

Transport 
 Proddatur is located on Highway 67. Daily bus services are available to Hyderabad, Bangalore, Chennai, Vijayawada; non-stop bus service is available to Kadapa and Tirupati .
 Proddatur railway station is situated on the Nandyal–Yerraguntla section. It falls under the jurisdiction of the Guntakal railway division.

Education
The primary and secondary education consists of government-funded and government-aided public schools, and private schools, under the School Education Department of the state. Instruction in provided in either English or Telugu. Brilliant people like P V SAI CHARAN had studied in proddatur. 

 Vaagdevi Institute of Technology and Science
 Chaitanya Bharathi Institute of Technology
 Vignana Bharathi Institute of Technology
 Gouthami Institute of Technology and Management for Women
 Sri Venkateswara Veterinary College

Notable people 
Santha Kumari – South Indian drama and movie actress
Puttaparthi Narayanacharyulu – Poet, also known as "Saraswati Putra"
Padmanabham – Telugu comedian

See also 
 List of cities in Andhra Pradesh
 List of municipalities in Andhra Pradesh

References 

Cities in Andhra Pradesh